Dicoelia is a plant genus of the family Phyllanthaceae. It was first described as a genus in 1879. It is native to Borneo and Sumatra.

Species
 Dicoelia beccariana Benth. - Borneo
 Dicoelia sumatrana Welzen - Sumatra

References

Phyllanthaceae
Phyllanthaceae genera
Flora of Malesia